Sangli State was one of the 11-gun salute Maratha princely states of British India. It was under the Kolhapur-Dekkan Residency in the Bombay Presidency, and later the Deccan States Agency.

The Principality of Sangli covered an area of 2,880 square kilometers and had a population of 226,128 in 1901, while the population of the town itself was 16,829 in that year.

The capital of the state was Sangli. The city derives its name from "Saha Galli" ("Six Lanes" in Marathi).

History
Sangli was part of Maratha Empire, for it had been one of the Southern Maratha Jagirs. However, there are no direct references mentioning Sangli before 1801. During the time of Chhatrapati Shivaji, Sangli, Miraj and surrounding areas were captured from the Mughal Empire. Until 1801, Sangli was included in the Miraj Jagir. The First Chintamanrao Appasaheb Patwardhan established a different principality with Sangli as the capital city.

On 5 May 1819 Sangli State became a British protectorate. Its territory was widely scattered among other native states and British districts.

The last ruler of Sangli was Capt. HH Shrimant Raja Saheb Sir Chintamanrao II Dhundirajrao Appasaheb Patwardhan. Sangli joined the Dominion of India on 19 February 1948 and is currently a part of the state of Maharashtra.

Rulers
The rulers of Sangli State were Hindu and belonged to the Patwardhan dynasty. They used the title of 'Rao'. The last ruler adopted the title 'Raja'

The Patwardhan rulers were of the Chitpavan Brahmin caste, originally from the Kotawada in Ratnagiri. Haribhat, who was the family priest of another Chitpavan Brahmin, the chief of Ichalkaranji. Three of Haribhat's sons served Peshwa and distinguished themselves during various conquests. The Peshwa awarded them Jagirs of Jamkhandi State, Miraj, Sangli and Kurundwad, to honor their bravery and courage.

Raos

1782 – 15 Jul 1851         Chintaman Rao I "Appa Sahib"       (b. 1776 - d. 1851)
1782 - 1801                Gangadharrao -Regent
15 Jul 1851 – 12 Dec 1901  Dhundi Rao Chintaman Rao  "Tatya Sahib"          (b. 1838 - d. 1901)
15 Jul 1851 – 12 Jul 1860  .... -Regent
12 Dec 1901 –  1 Jun 1932  Chintaman Rao II Dhundi Rao  "Appa Sahib"      (b. 1890 - d. 1965) (from 1 Jan *1923, Sir Chintaman Rao II Dhundi Rao)
12 Dec 1901 –  2 Jun 1910  Richard John Charles Burke -Regent (b. 1878 - d. 1960)

Raja

 1 Jun 1932 – 8 March 1965   Sir Chintaman Rao Dhundi Rao  "Appa Sahib"      (s.a.)
 9 March 1965 - Till date Raja Vijaysinh Patwardhan

See also
 List of Maratha dynasties and states
 List of Brahmin dynasties and states
 List of Indian princely states

References

Princely states of Maharashtra
Sangli district
1782 establishments in India
1948 disestablishments in India